Rosemary is a name for several plants of the Genus Salvia and Ceratiola.

Rosemary may also refer to:

Music 
 "Rosemary", a song by Gomez from their 2000 compilation album Abandoned Shopping Trolley Hotline
 "Rosemary", a 1961 song composed by Frank Loesser
 "Rosemary", a song from the 1969 Grateful Dead album Aoxomoxoa
 "Rosemary", a brief romantic piano work by Frank Bridge
 "Rosemary", a song from Katy Rose's 2007 album Candy Eyed
 "Rosemary", a song from Lenny Kravitz's 1989 album Let Love Rule
 "Rosemary", a song from Deftones' 2012 album Koi No Yokan
 "Rose Marie", Slim Whitman's song
 "Rosemarie", a 1935 German love song composed by Herms Niel

Places 
Rosemary, Alberta, Canada
Rosemary Rock, Three Kings Islands, New Zealand
Rosemary Island, Western Australia

Given name 
 Rosemary (given name), the given name
 Rosemary (Metal Gear), a video game character from the Metal Gear Solid series
 "Rosemary," stage name of Hong Kong-French singer Rosemary Vandenbroucke
 Rose Marie, an actress who portrayed Sally Rogers on The Dick Van Dyke Show
 Rosemary (wrestler), professional wrestler
 Rosemary (poet), Malayalam language poet and translator

Other 
 Rosemary (radio), a radio daytime soap opera broadcast on NBC from 1944 to 1945 and on CBS from 1945 to 1955
 Rosemary & Thyme, a British television series that starred Felicity Kendal and Pam Ferris as gardening detectives Rosemary Boxer and Laura Thyme.
 Rosemary, 1958 German film about Rosemarie Nitribitt
 "Rosemarie", Mickey Dolenz song from the 1987 album, Missing Links
V 310 Rosemarie - a Kriegsmarine vorpostenboot that served as a fishing trawler before and after the Second World War
 , a British sloop that served during both world wars.

See also

 Rosemary's Baby, a horror novel
 Rosemary's Baby (film), a film based on above novel.
 
 
 Mary Rose (disambiguation)
 Rose Marie (disambiguation)
 Rose (disambiguation)
 Mary (disambiguation)